Taman Siswa was a Javanese educational movement and school system founded by Ki Hadjar Dewantara in 1922.

Sources
 Meijers, C. H., 1973, De Taman Siswa en het regeringsonderwijs: Ontwikkelingen in het Indonesische onderwijs vanaf 1945. Amsterdam: Doctoraalscriptie.
 Reksohadiprodjo, Mohammad Said, 1976, Taman Siswa's Gedachten Wereld. Jakarta, Indonesia: Yayasan Idayu.
 Tsuchiya, Kenji, 1988, Democracy and Leadership: The Rise of the Taman Siswa Movement in Indonesia. Honolulu, HI: University of Hawaii Press, 
 Ki Hadjar Dewantara, 1935, Een en ander over Nationaal Onderwijs en het Instituut 'Taman Siswa' te Jogjakarta
 Tuin, J. van der, 1996, Voor volk of vaderland? De intenties van de overheid aangaande het 'wilde onderwijs' in Nederlands-Indië, 1920-1940. Leiden: RU-Leiden, doctoraalscriptie pedagogiek/onderwijskunde

Dutch East Indies
Education in Indonesia
Schools in the Dutch East Indies